Bijoy Singh Nahar (born 7 November 1906, date of death unknown) was an Indian politician. He was a Member of Parliament, representing Calcutta North West in the Lok Sabha, the lower house of India's Parliament representing the Janata Party.

References

External links
Official biographical sketch in Parliament of India website

Lok Sabha members from West Bengal
Janata Party politicians
1906 births
Year of death missing
Indian National Congress politicians from West Bengal